Gabriel "Gabe" Gómez is a poet, journalist, and marketing professional.

Born in El Paso, Texas, Gómez is the author of The Outer Bands (University of Notre Dame Press, 2007), which was selected by Valerie Martinez as the 2007 winner of the Andrés Montoya Poetry Prize.  The title poem is a found poem on the experiences of living through Hurricane Katrina and Hurricane Rita.
His second collection of poetry, The Seed Bank, was published by Mouthfeel Press. Gómez earned a bachelor's of arts degree at the College of Santa Fe (now Santa Fe University of Art and Design) and a master's of fine arts degree at Saint Mary's College of California. He has taught at Tulane University, the University of New Orleans,  and the Institute of American Indian Arts. He lives in Santa Fe, New Mexico.

Works

Poetry
 The Outer Bands (University of Notre Dame Press, 2007)
 The Seed Bank (Mouthfeel Press)

References

External links
 Author website
 Biography at Poetry Foundation

American male poets
Hispanic and Latino American poets
Hispanic and Latino American writers
Living people
Writers from El Paso, Texas
Santa Fe University of Art and Design alumni
Saint Mary's College of California alumni
Poets from Texas
Year of birth missing (living people)
Tulane University faculty
University of New Orleans faculty
College of Santa Fe faculty
Institute of American Indian Arts faculty